The 4th Screen Actors Guild Awards, honoring the best achievements in film and television performances for the year 1997, took place on March 8, 1998. The ceremony was held at the Shrine Exposition Center in Los Angeles, California, and was televised live by TNT.

The nominees were announced on January 27, 1998, by Melissa Joan Hart and David Paymer.

Winners and nominees
Winners are listed first and highlighted in boldface.

Screen Actors Guild Life Achievement Award
 Elizabeth Taylor

Film

Television

In Memoriam
Gloria Stuart presented this segment in which the guild remembered its most famous members who died last year: 

 Richard Jaeckel
 Brian Keith
 Jack Lord
 William Hickey
 Audra Lindley
 Ferdy Mayne
 Denver Pyle
 Philip Abbott
 Ted Bessell
 Red Skelton
 Pat Paulsen
 Stubby Kaye
 Chris Farley
 Sonny Bono
 Henny Youngman
 Burgess Meredith
 Paul Lambert
 Charles Hallahan
 Reid Shelton
 Edward Mulhare
 John Denver
 J. T. Walsh
 Toshiro Mifune
 Jacques Cousteau
 Robert Mitchum
 James Stewart

References

External links
 The 4th Annual Screen Actors Guild Awards

1997
1997 film awards
1997 television awards
Screen
Screen Actors Guild
Screen
March 1998 events in the United States